Sant Banka (Marathi: संत बंका) also known as Wanka was a poet in 14th century Maharashtra, India. He was husband to Nirmala and brother-in-law to Chokhamela.  Born in Mehenpuri, Banka was a member of the Mahar caste. In most of his abhangs he praised  Vitthal in happiness and peace. Infrequently, he described his lower caste birth.

As a bhakti poet saint from the Mahar caste, Banka raised a voice against untouchability which is very relevant to current Dalit literature.

References

Warkari
14th-century Indian poets
Marathi-language poets
Dalit literature
Hindu poets
Poets from Maharashtra